The women's heptathlon event at the 2020 Summer Olympics took place on 4 and 5 August 2021 at the Japan National Stadium. 24 athletes competed.

Background
This was the 10th appearance of the event, having appeared in every Summer Olympics since 1984.

Qualification

A National Olympic Committee (NOC) could enter up to 3 qualified athletes in the women's heptathlon event if all athletes meet the entry standard or qualify by ranking during the qualifying period. (The limit of 3 has been in place since the 1930 Olympic Congress.) The qualifying standard is 6420 points. This standard was "set for the sole purpose of qualifying athletes with exceptional performances unable to qualify through the IAAF World Rankings pathway." The world rankings, based on the average of the best five results for the athlete over the qualifying period and weighted by the importance of the meet, will then be used to qualify athletes until the cap of 24 is reached.

The qualifying period was originally from 1 January 2019 to 29 June 2020. Due to the COVID-19 pandemic, the period was suspended from 6 April 2020 to 30 November 2020, with the end date extended to 29 June 2021. The qualifying time standards could be obtained in various meets during the given period that have the approval of the IAAF. Both outdoor and indoor meets are eligible. The most recent Area Championships may be counted in the ranking, even if not during the qualifying period.

NOCs cannot use their universality place in the heptathlon.

Competition format
The heptathlon consisted of seven track and field events, with a points system that awarded higher scores for better results in each of the seven components. The athletes all competed in one competition with no elimination rounds.

Records
Prior to this competition, the existing world, Olympic, and area records were as follows.

Schedule
All times are Japan Standard Time (UTC+9)

The women's heptathlon took place over two consecutive days, with 4 events on the first day and 3 events on the second day.

Detailed results

100 metres hurdles

High jump

Shot put

200 metres

Long jump

Javelin throw

800 metres

Overall results 
Key

References

Women's heptathlon
2020
Women's events at the 2020 Summer Olympics
Olympics